PVF-Cong An Nhan Dan Football Club (PVF-CAND), or PVF-People's Public Security FC, formerly Pho Hien Football Club, is a professional football club based in Văn Giang, Hưng Yên, south of Hà Nội. The club plays in V.League 2, which is the second highest tier of football in Vietnam. Their home stadium is PVF Stadium, located within the perimeter of PVF Football Academy.

Current squad
As of 18 August 2022

Technical Staff

Notable players
 Huỳnh Công Đến
 Lê Bật Hiếu
 Lê Ngọc Bảo
 Lê Văn Đô
 Martin Lo
 Nguyễn Thanh Nhàn
 Nguyễn Xuân Nam
 Trần Bảo Toàn
 Võ Nguyên Hoàng

Managers
2018-2021: Hứa Hiền Vinh
2022–present: Mauro Alexandre Tavares Jeronimo

Kit suppliers and shirt sponsors

Honours

Senior Competitions
Vietnamese League Two:
 Third Place: 2018
V.League 2:
 Runners-up: 2019

Youth Competitions
Vietnamese National U-21 Football Championship:
 Runners-up: 2019
 Third Place: 2021

References

External links 

Football clubs in Vietnam